Endau Bridge is a main bridge in Pahang and Johor state, Malaysia. The bridge is located along Federal Route 3 and the confluence of Endau River, a river boundary of Pahang and Johor state. Among the activities is fishing population. Several jetties built along the river.

Bridges in Johor
Bridges in Pahang
Mersing District